The Sala Regia (Regal Room) is a state hall in the Apostolic Palace in Vatican City. 

Although not intended as such, this broad room is really an antechamber to the Sistine Chapel. It also connects to the Pauline Chapel and is reached by the long staircase known as the Scala Regia. To the left of the entrance formerly stood the papal throne, which is now at the opposite side before the door leading to the Pauline Chapel.

The hall was begun under Pope Paul III by Antonio da Sangallo the Younger and was completed in 1573. The elegant barrel vault is graced by the very impressive plaster decorations of Perino del Vaga. The stucco ornaments over the doors are by Daniele da Volterra. By 2019, the room and staircase were open to tourists who visit the Apostolic Palace.

The walls were decorated by Livio Agresti, Giorgio Vasari and Taddeo Zuccari. The frescoes depict momentous turning-points in the history of the Church, including the return of Pope Gregory XI from Avignon to Rome, the Battle of Lepanto, three panels narrating events surrounding the St. Bartholomew's Day massacre, the raising of the ban from Henry IV, the reconciliation of Pope Alexander III with Frederick Barbarossa and Peter II of Aragon offering the Kingdom to Pope Innocent III.

The hall was originally used for the reception of princes and royal ambassadors, hence its name. Consistories were held in it, but were later transferred to the Saint Peter's Basilica on November 19, 2016, and the area has also provided an occasional musical recital in the presence of the pope; during a conclave it was used as a promenade for the cardinals.

Gallery

See also
Index of Vatican City-related articles

References

Attribution

External links

The Vatican: spirit and art of Christian Rome, a book from The Metropolitan Museum of Art Libraries (fully available online as PDF), which contains material on Sala Regia (pp. 126–127)
 Alessio Celletti, Autorappresentazione papale ed età della Riforma: gli affreschi della Sala Regia Vaticana, Eurostudium, Roma 2013.

Apostolic Palace
Individual rooms
Vatican Museums